Myths of the Near Future Part One is the second album by Mo Boma, released in 1994 through Extreme Records.

Track listing

Personnel 
Mo Boma
Jamshied Sharifi – synthesizer, percussion, engineering
Skúli Sverrisson – bass guitar, engineering
Carsten Tiedemann – electric guitar, EBow, lute, synthesizer, percussion, production, mixing, recording
Production and additional personnel
Günter Derleth – photography
Silke – cover art

References

External links 
 

1994 albums
Extreme Records albums
Mo Boma albums